The 1965 American Road Race of Champions was the second running of the SCCA National Championship Runoffs. It took place on 27 and 28 November 1965 at Daytona International Speedway, on 3,1-mile and 1,6-mile courses. Despite the National Championship being cancelled, the ARRC still was not a championship race, as National Championships were awarded to Divisional winners. Most competitive drivers from SCCA's seven divisions were invited to the event.

Changes for 1965 
1965 saw several changes in SCCA's class structure.

Formula Libre was split up in Formula A for under-3-litre racing engines and Formula B for 1,6-litre production engines. Formula Junior was now replaced by Formula C for 1,1-litre racing engines.

New cars were homologated for Production classes, including the new Porsche 911. Some other cars were reclassified, for example the Austin-Healey 100-6.

Race results 
Sources:

Class winners for multi-class races in bold.

Race 1 - H Production 
The first race, held on November 27, was the H Production race. It was held on the 1,6-mile course for 45 minutes and 32 laps.

Race 2 - H Modified 
The H Modified race was held on November 27 on the 1,6-mile course for 45 minutes and 35 laps.

Race 3 - G Production 
The G Production race was held on November 27 on the 1,6-mile course for 45 minutes and 33 laps.

Race 4 - G Modified 
The G Modified race was held on November 27 on the 1,6-mile course for 45 minutes and 36 laps.

Race 5 - F Production 
The F Production race was held on November 27 on the 1,6-mile course for 45 minutes and 34 laps.

Race 6 - E Production 
The E Production race was held on November 27 on the 1,6-mile course for 45 minutes and 34 laps.

Race 7 - C & D Production 
C Production and D Production cars raced in a multi-class race held on November 28 on the 3,1-mile course for 45 minutes and 24 laps.

Race 8 - Formula A, B & C 
Formula B and Formula C cars raced in a multi-class race held on November 28 on the 1,6-mile course for 45 minutes and 38 laps. Despite the 3-litre Formula A already being introduced, the number of cars was so small that no drivers were invited.

Race 9 - Formula Vee 
The Formula Vee race was held on November 28 on the 1,6-mile course for 45 minutes and 33 laps.

Race 10 - A & B Production 
A Production and B Production drivers raced in a multi-class race held on November 28 on the 3,1-mile course for 45 minutes and 25 laps.

Race 11 - C, D, E & F Modified 
C Modified, D Modified, E Modified and F Modified drivers raced in a multi-class race held on November 28 on the 3,1-mile course for 45 minutes and 25 laps.

Notes

H Production 
 Turgeon and Barton are both listed as sixth-place qualifiers.

 Only 15 cars qualified for the race, but Brownfield and Garrison are listed as 16th-place qualifiers.

E Production 
 Only 18 cars qualified for the race, but Zitza and Collins are listed as 19th- and 20th-place qualifiers.

Formula A, B & C 
 Only 19 cars qualified for the race, but SCCA's website lists 20th- and 21th-place qualifiers.

 Bunn is said to drive a Lola T55 by some other sources.

A & B Production 
 Heinz's qualifying position is unknown, but the 16th-place qualifier is also unknown, so it is most likely that Heinz is the last qualifier in class.

C, D, E & F Modified 
 Only 25 cars qualified for the race, but most sources list 32nd- through 36th-place qualifiers.

 Non-finishers' laps are listed differently on different sources.

References 

SCCA National Sports Car Championship
SCCA National Championship Runoffs
1965 in American motorsport